Jan Kasper (21 September 1932 in Soběšovice – 4 March 2005 in Ostrava) was a Czech ice hockey player who competed in the 1956 Winter Olympics and in the 1960 Winter Olympics.

References

External links

1932 births
2005 deaths
Ice hockey players at the 1956 Winter Olympics
Ice hockey players at the 1960 Winter Olympics
Olympic ice hockey players of Czechoslovakia
People from Frýdek-Místek District
Sportspeople from Ostrava
Czech ice hockey defencemen
Czechoslovak ice hockey defencemen
Czechoslovak expatriate sportspeople in Austria
Czechoslovak expatriate ice hockey people
Expatriate ice hockey players in Austria